T. V. Ramprasadh is an Indian Carnatic music singer.

Life and career

Training
After his training from Mahalakshmi Natrajan (Bombay) and Sharada Satyanarayana, Ramprasadh received his advanced training from maestros like Padma Bhushan P. S. Narayanaswamy, Sangita Kalacharya, S Rajam, T. V. Gopalakrishnan and R.R. Keshavamurthy.

See Also
Rahul Vellal

Notes

References
 www.artindia.net
 www.musiciansgallery.com
 Manoranjitham's Gokulashtami Navaratri Music Festival review from The Hindu

External links
 TV Ramprasadh's Official Site

1969 births
Living people
Male Carnatic singers
Carnatic singers
Singers from Mumbai